Christina Hardyment (born 1946) is a British writer who has written on a wide range of subjects including parenting, food, gardens, children's books, domestic life, and British history.

Personal life
Hardyment lived mainly in England, save for a few years in South Africa, from 1951 to 1953. After completing university, she learned that her father was Norwegian writer and soldier Eiliv Odde Hauge, which led her to contact her Norwegian relatives and establish connections. She married Tom Griffith in 1969. They had four daughters, and ten grandchildren. Though on good terms, they divorced in 1991.

Hardyment is the author of numerous books on social history and literature. In 2005, her biography of Sir thomas Malory, the author of the Morte Darthur.

In 2015 she edited a new food anthology, The Pleasures of the Table. She is a journalist and occasionally writes book reviews. Her most recent books are Writing the Thames, published in 2016, which is about the River Thames in literature in history, and Novel Houses: Twenty legendary literary dwellings', published in 2018. and widely reviewed. She is now working on a trilogy of novels about Alyce Chaucer, granddaughter of the poet Geoffrey Chaucer.

From 1989 to he was the founder Editor of the University of Oxford's alumni magazine Oxford Today (noe edited online by Richard Lofthouse.

She is the Senior Executor of the Arthur Ransome Literary Estate.

She review audiobooks weekly for The Times Saturday Review.

She lives in Oxford, revelling in gardening and enjoying sailing and punting on the River Thames.

Works 
 1983: Dream Babies: child care from Locke to Spock London: Cape, reprinted in 2012 as  Dream Babies: child care from Locke to Gina Ford, LondonFrancis Lincoln
 1984: Arthur Ransome and Captain Flint's Trunk London: Jonathan Cape 
 1988: From Mangle to Microwave: the mechanization of household work Cambridge: Polity Press
 1992: Home Comfort: A History of Domestic Arrangements London: Viking and the National Trust 
 1995: Slice of Life: the British way of Eating Since 1945, London: BBC Books 
 2005: Malory : the knight who became King Arthur's chronicler London: HarperCollins 
 2010: University of Oxford: The Official Guide, University of Oxford, 
 2012: Writing Britain: Wastelands to Wonderlands London: British Library 
 2013: The World of Arthur Ransome: Frances Lincoln, 
 2015: Pleasures of the Table London: British Library
 2016: Writing the Thames, Bodleian Library 
 2018: ''Novel Houses', Bodleian Library

References

Women food writers
1946 births
Living people
British women writers